Tiago Martins may refer to:
Tiago Martins (referee) (born 1980), Portuguese referee
Tiago Martins (footballer, born 1987), Portuguese footballer
Tiago Luís Martins (born 1989), Brazilian footballer
Tiago Martins (footballer, born 1998), Portuguese footballer

See also
Thiago Martins (disambiguation)